Raphitoma desmoulinsi is an extinct species of sea snail, a marine gastropod mollusc in the family Raphitomidae.

Description
The length of the shell reaches  15 mm.

Distribution
Fossils of this extinct marine species were found in Upper Pliocene strata in Emilia, Italy.

References

External links
 Bellardi, Luigi. Monografia delle Pleurotome fossili del Piemonte. Stamperia Reale, 1847
 

desmoulinsi
Gastropods described in 1847